Istmina is a municipality and town in the Chocó Department, Colombia. The town of Istmina was founded in 1834 by Juan Nepomuceno Mosquera, initially with the name of San Pablo. The name was changed in 1903 to Istmina, a contraction of isthmus and minas (mines), two characteristics of the area.

Climate
Istmina has a very wet tropical rainforest climate (Af).

References

This article is based in part on material from the Spanish Wikipedia.

External links
  Istmina official municipality website

Municipalities of Chocó Department